The 1996 McNeese State Cowboys football team was an American football team that represented McNeese State University as a member of the Southland Conference (Southland) during the 1996 NCAA Division I-AA football season. In their seventh year under head coach Bobby Keasler, the team compiled an overall record of 3–8, with a mark of 1–5 in conference play, and finished seventh in the Southland.

Schedule

References

McNeese State
McNeese Cowboys football seasons
McNeese State Cowboys football